Wenzl may refer to:

 Wenzl (surname)
 Birman–Wenzl algebra, family of algebras